{{DISPLAYTITLE:Omega2 Cancri}}

 
 

 

ω2 Cancri is a star in the zodiac constellation Cancer, located around 810 light years away from the Sun. It has the Flamsteed designation 4 Cancri; ω2 Cancri is the Bayer designation, which is Latinised to omega2 Cancri and abbreviated to ω2 Cnc or omega2 Cnc. The star is near the lower limit of visibility to the naked eye, having an apparent visual magnitude of 6.32. It is moving closer to the Earth with a heliocentric radial velocity of −8 km/s. The position of this star near the ecliptic means it is subject to lunar occultations.

This is an ordinary A-type main-sequence star with a stellar classification of A1 V, which indicates it is generating energy through hydrogen fusion at its core. It has 2.6 times the mass of the Sun and about 2.5 times the Sun's radius. The star is radiating 68 times the Sun's luminosity from its photosphere at an effective temperature of 9354 K.

References

A-type main-sequence stars
Cancer (constellation)
Cancri, Omega2
BD+25 1816
Cancri, 04
065856
039263
3132